Sheikh Abdullah bin Husayn bin Nasser al-Ahmar (1 November 1933 – 29 December 2007) was a politician and tribe leader of Yemen. He was the Speaker of the House of Representatives (Yemen) from 1993 to 2007 and also was the Sheikh of the Hashid tribal federation and the Al-Islah party.

He inherited the position of Sheikh of the Hashid tribal federation from his father, Husayn Bin Nasser al-Ahmar, who was executed by Imam Ahmad bin Yahya. As a result, during the North Yemen Civil War Abdullah al-Ahmar sided with the Republicans against the Royalists and was appointed governor of Hajjah, but he refused to join the Egyptian-backed government of Abdullah as-Sallal. After Egypt withdrew from Yemen, he helped topple the Sallal government and his tribes provided crucial support to the new regime of Abdul Rahman al-Iryani against the royalists.

In 1970, the civil war ended with the abolition of the monarchy and al-Ahmar became first the president of new National Council 1969–1971, and then the president of Shura Council 1971–1975.

When Colonel Ibrahim al-Hamdi seized power in 1974, he tried to limit the representation of the tribal leaders, which led to an open rebellion by the Hashid tribes. After the assassination of Hamdi in 1977, Saudi Arabia helped bring about a reconciliation between the tribes and the new government in 1978, first under Ahmad al-Ghashmi and then under Ali Abdullah Saleh. Ali Abdullah Saleh who also belongs to the Hashid tribal confederation. Abdullah Al-Ahmar was appointed to the Constituent People's Assembly.

Although he opposed the government of South Yemen, he supported the 1990 unification of North and South Yemen and formed the Islah Party, which represents tribal as well as Islamic interests. The Islah Party won 62 seats out of 301 in the parliamentary elections of 1993, in which it ran in coalition with President Saleh's People General Congress (PGC), and al-Ahmar was elected speaker of parliament. In 1997, the party won 56 seats and al-Ahmar was re-elected speaker of parliament. Though his party won only 45 seats in the 2003 elections and was no longer in coalition with the PGC (which won a majority of 225 seats), al-Ahmar was re-elected speaker of parliament; he was again re-elected to that post in 2007.

Al-Ahmar died of cancer on 29 December 2007, aged 74, at the King Faisal Specialist Hospital in Riyadh, Saudi Arabia. Three days of mourning were declared for al-Ahmar, who was considered Yemen's second most powerful person.

His son Sadiq al-Ahmar succeeded him in the positions of the Sheikh of the Hashid tribal federation and the Al-Islah tribal confederacy, and remains in those positions intact.

He and his family, like many north Yemenis, are "Zaydi by parentage and Sunni by denominational conversion via partisan affiliation with Islah."

References

External links
Late Sheikh Al-Ahmar: Man of national compromise, Hatem Ali, Yemen Times, 3 January 2008

1933 births
2007 deaths
Speakers of the House of Representatives (Yemen)
Deaths from cancer in Saudi Arabia
Date of birth missing
Al-Islah (Yemen) politicians
Converts to Sunni Islam from Shia Islam
Speakers of North Yemen legislature
People from Amran Governorate
Yemeni tribal chiefs
20th-century Yemeni politicians
Burials in Yemen